Cobelli is an Italian surname. Notable people with the surname include:

 Giancarlo Cobelli (1929–2012), Italian actor and stage director
  (born 1936), Italian actor
 Giovanni Cobelli (1849–1937), Italian civil servant and naturalist
 Giuseppina Cobelli (1898–1948), Italian opera singer
 Juan Manuel Cobelli (born 1988), Argentine footballer
  (born 1500), Italian painter and historian
 Ruggero Cobelli (1838–1921), Italian entomologist
 Sebastián Cobelli (born 1978), Argentine footballer

Italian-language surnames